Dongshankou Station is an underground station on Line 1 of the Guangzhou Metro that started operations on 28June 1999. It is situated under Zhongshan Road, Nonglinxia Road, Donghua Road South, and Shuqian Road in the Dongshankou area of Yuexiu District. The station takes its name from the former business district of Dongshan.

Station layout

References

External links
A Guangzhou Metro train departing Dong Shan Kou Station

Railway stations in China opened in 1999
Guangzhou Metro stations in Yuexiu District